George Baldwin Selden (September 14, 1846 – January 17, 1922) was an American patent lawyer and inventor from New York who was granted a U.S. patent for an automobile in 1895.<ref name ="flink51">Flink, p. 51 Probably the most absurd action in the history of patent law was the granting of United States patent number 549,160 on November 5, 1895, to George B. Selden. a Rochester, New York, patent lawyer and inventor, for an "improved road engine" powered by "a liquid-hydrocarbon engine of the compression type."</ref>Borth, Christy. Masters of Mass Production, pp. 38, 152, Bobbs-Merrill Co., Indianapolis, IN, 1945.

Early life and career
In 1859, his father, Judge Henry R. Selden, a prominent Republican attorney most noted for defending Susan B. Anthony, moved to Rochester, New York, where George briefly attended the University of Rochester. 

He dropped out when the American Civil War started, enlisting in the 6th Cavalry Regiment, Union Army. This was not to the liking of his father who, after pulling some strings and having some earnest discussions with his son, managed to have him released from duty and enrolled in Yale. George did not do well at Yale in his law studies, preferring the technical studies offered by the Sheffield Scientific School, but did finish his course of study and pass the New York bar in 1871. He joined his father's practice.

He married shortly thereafter to Clara Drake Woodruff, with whom he had 4 children. He continued his hobby of inventing in a workshop in his father's basement, inventing a typewriter and a hoop making machine.

For a time, Selden represented photography pioneer George Eastman in patent matters. He was also based in Rochester.

The Selden patent

Inspired by the mammoth internal combustion engine invented by George Brayton displayed at the Centennial Exposition in Philadelphia in 1876, Selden began working on a smaller, lighter version, succeeding by 1878, some eight years before the public introduction of the Benz Patent Motorwagen in Europe, in producing a one-cylinder, 400-pound version which featured an enclosed crankshaft with the help of Rochester machinist Frank H. Clement and his assistant William Gomm. He filed for a patent on May 8, 1879 (in a historical cross of people, the witness Selden chose was a local bank-teller, George Eastman, later to become famous for the Kodak camera). His application included not only the engine but its use in a 4-wheeled car. He then filed a series of amendments to his application which stretched out the legal process resulting in a delay of 16 years before the patent  was granted on November 5, 1895.

Shortly thereafter the fledgling American auto industry began its first efforts and George Selden, despite never having gone into production with a working model of an automobile, had a credible claim to have patented an automobile in 1895. In 1899 he sold his patent rights to William C. Whitney, who proposed manufacturing electric-powered taxicabs as the Electric Vehicle Company, EVC, for a royalty of US$15 per car with a minimum annual payment of US$5,000. Whitney and Selden then worked together to collect royalties from other budding automobile manufacturers. He was initially successful, negotiating a 0.75% royalty on all cars sold by the Association of Licensed Automobile Manufacturers. He began his own car company in Rochester under the name Selden Motor Vehicle Company.

However, Henry Ford, owner of the Ford Motor Company, founded in Detroit, Michigan, in 1903, and four other car makers resolved to contest the patent infringement suit filed by Selden and EVC. The legal fight lasted eight years, generating a case record of 14,000 pages. Ford's testimony included the comment, "It is perfectly safe to say that George Selden has never advanced the automobile industry in a single particular...and it would perhaps be further advanced than it is now if he had never been born."

The case was heavily publicized in the newspapers of the day, and ended in a victory for Selden. In his decision, the judge wrote that the patent covered any automobile propelled by an engine powered by gasoline vapor. Posting a bond of US$350,000, Ford appealed, and on January 10, 1911, won his case based on an argument that the engine used in automobiles was not based on George Brayton's engine, the Brayton engine which Selden had improved, but on the Otto engine.

This stunning defeat, with only one year left to run on the patent, destroyed Selden's income stream. He focused production of his car company on trucks, renaming his company the Selden Truck Sales Corporation. It survived in that form until 1930 when it was purchased by the Bethlehem Motor Truck Corporation. Selden suffered a stroke in late 1921 and died aged 75 on January 17, 1922. He was buried in Mount Hope Cemetery in Rochester. It is estimated he received several hundred thousand dollars in royalties.

See also
 The Wright brothers patent war, another vehicular technology patent lawsuit of the same time period
 George Brayton, inventor of the Brayton cycle engine

Footnotes

References
Based on pages 184-199 of The Mayflower Murderer & Other Forgotten Firsts in American History, Peter F. Stevens, William Morrow, hardcover, 272 pages, . Published simultaneously on Wikinfo.
Flink, James J., The Automobile Age'', MIT Press (1990),

External links

The Selden Motor Wagon Photos of the vehicle, plus articles about the gestation of the patent and the lengthy lawsuit which followed.

1846 births
1922 deaths
American automotive pioneers
20th-century American inventors
Burials at Mount Hope Cemetery (Rochester)
Discovery and invention controversies
Yale School of Engineering & Applied Science alumni
People from Clarkson, New York
Union Army soldiers